Coutoubea is a genus of flowering plants belonging to the family Gentianaceae.

Its native range is Mexico, Central and Southern Tropical America.

Species:

Coutoubea humilis 
Coutoubea minor 
Coutoubea ramosa 
Coutoubea reflexa 
Coutoubea spicata

References

Gentianaceae
Gentianaceae genera